John Alexander Thain (born May 26, 1955) is an American financial executive and investment banker. He served as president and co-COO of Goldman Sachs, and then CEO of the New York Stock Exchange. Thain then became the last chairman and CEO of Merrill Lynch before its merger with Bank of America. He was designated to become president of global banking, securities, and wealth management at the newly combined company, but resigned on January 22, 2009. Ken Lewis, CEO of Bank of America, reportedly forced Thain to step down after several controversies, such as the losses at Merrill Lynch which proved to be far larger than previously estimated, and the award of huge executive bonuses. Thain then served as chairman and CEO of the CIT Group. He is currently a board member of Uber, appointed by former Uber CEO Travis Kalanick on September 29, 2017.

Background
Thain was born in Antioch, Illinois. His father, Alan, was a doctor who has since handed his practice on to Thain's two brothers, Dennis and Robert, both general practitioners. He earned a bachelor's degree in electrical engineering from MIT in 1977 and an MBA from Harvard Business School in 1979. While attending MIT, Thain joined the Delta Upsilon fraternity.

Career

Thain worked at Goldman Sachs, as head of its mortgage securities division from 1985 to 1990, and president and co-chief operating officer from 1999 to 2004.

After leaving Goldman Sachs, Thain served as CEO of the New York Stock Exchange from January 2004 to December 2007. In December 2003, interim chairman John Reed at the New York Stock Exchange told The Wall Street Journal that Thain would be paid "a plain vanilla number", about $4 million a year including bonuses, with no "strange retirement" program like the one former NYSE CEO Dick Grasso was given.

Merrill Lynch
Before he accepted the CEO position at Merrill Lynch, Thain reportedly was one of the runners-up to head Citigroup. Merrill Lynch and Citigroup sought new leaders following the sudden departure of their former CEOs after the disappointing performance in the third quarter of 2007 due to the subprime mortgage crisis. Nelson Chai, the CFO of the New York Stock Exchange under Thain, followed his mentor to Merrill Lynch and assumed the same role as CFO.

Thain arranged the sale of Merrill to Bank of America at $29 per share, a 70 percent premium over the market price. The deal valued the brokerage at $50 billion. Thain was expected to be president of global banking, securities and wealth management, a new division at Bank of America, to oversee its corporate and investment bank and most of wealth management business.

Upon joining Merrill Lynch, Thain received a $15 million signing bonus. The firm announced that Thain would receive at least $50 million a year and could be paid as much as $120 million a year, based on the company's stock price. The Associated Press identified Thain, who received $83.1 million, as one of the best paid executives of S&P 500 companies in 2007. In that year, Thain earned a total compensation of $83,785,021, which included a base salary of $750,000, a cash bonus of $15 million, stock grant of $33,013,151, and options grant of $35,017,421.

Thain suggested to the directors that he receive a bonus in 2008 of as much as $10 million, because he "saved Merrill" by selling it off to Bank of America. After the compensation committee at Merrill refused the request, Thain reportedly dropped it on December 8, 2008.

It was revealed on January 22, 2009 that Thain spent $1.22 million of corporate funds in early 2008 to renovate two conference rooms, a reception area, and his office, spending $131,000 for area rugs, $68,000 for an antique credenza, $87,000 for guest chairs, $35,115 for a gold-plated commode on legs, and $1,100 for a wastebasket. Thain subsequently apologized for his lapse in judgment, and reimbursed the company in full for the costs.

Thain accelerated approximately $4 billion in bonus payments to employees at Merrill just prior to the close of the deal with Bank of America. Bank of America was aware of the payment, as allowing the payment to go through was reportedly one of the conditions under the merger agreement. Speculation mounted that some of TARP fund was used for the bonus payment, but TARP recipients were not required to disclose how the funds were segregated, or what they were used for.

Sheila Bair, chair of the FDIC reported that during a meeting with the Treasury secretary at the depth of the financial panic, Thain asked the secretary if the TARP program would impact his compensation.

Departure from Bank of America
On January 16, 2009, Bank of America announced that Merrill suffered an unexpected loss of $15 billion for the fourth quarter of 2008. Bank of America CEO Ken Lewis said that, without $138 billion in government assistance, including the infusion of $20 billion from the federal government, he would have pulled out of the Merrill deal, which had been approved by Bank of America shareholders in early December. People close to Lewis say his relationship with Thain was strained by Merrill's massive fourth quarter loss. Lewis himself faced criticism for rushing to buy Merrill for $28 billion after less than two days of due diligence.

On January 22, 2009, on CNBC's The Call, Charlie Gasparino said that Thain was going to meet Lewis later in the day. Gasparino added that Thain's future at Bank of America was in doubt, although it was not certain whether he would be leaving. Gasparino then said that Thain spent $1.22 million to refurbish his office, shortly after he had been named as CEO of Merrill in January 2008. Merrill was still an independent firm at the time, and some analysts predicted that, with Thain as new CEO, the company would be back on track for a strong performance in the midst of disappointing results on Wall Street.

The tension between Thain and Lewis had been building since mid-December and culminated on January 22, 2009, when Lewis flew to New York to meet with Thain. After a 15-minute conversation between the two men, Thain agreed to resign. Nelson Chai, Merrill's last CFO prior to its merger, was initially slated to relocate to Hong Kong to head Bank of America's Asia business. but Chai departed from Bank of America in February, just two weeks after the ouster of Thain, and was replaced by Ki-Myung Hong. Thain and Chai's departures left just one other member of Merrill's management team at the combined company, Tom Montag, as head of sales and trading.

Criticism of excessive compensation
On January 23, 2009, President Obama referred to Thain by saying "the reports that we’ve seen over the last couple of days about companies that have received taxpayer assistance then going out and renovating bathrooms or offices or in other ways not managing those dollars appropriately." White House press secretary Robert Gibbs also said taxpayer money shouldn't go to "line the pockets of people" who had gotten financial assistance. "The American people need to be greatly assured that their hard-earned money is not going to the bonuses or the remodeling of an office at a bank that's in trouble," Gibbs said.

On January 29, 2009, President Obama publicly criticized the large bonuses such as those handed out by Thain. Obama said: "I saw an article today indicating that Wall Street bankers had given themselves $20 billion worth of bonuses at a time when most of these institutions were teetering on collapse and they are asking for taxpayers to help sustain them, and when taxpayers find themselves in the difficult position that if they don't provide help that the entire system could come down on top of our heads—that is the height of irresponsibility. It is shameful. And part of what we're going to need is for folks on Wall Street who are asking for help to show some restraint and show some discipline and show some sense of responsibility. The American people understand that we've got a big hole that we've got to dig ourselves out of—but they don't like the idea that people are digging a bigger hole even as they're being asked to fill it up." Vice President Joe Biden also said the bonuses "offends the sensibilities. I mean, I'd like to throw these guys in the brig."

On January 27, 2009, New York Attorney General Andrew Cuomo issued a subpoena to Thain in a probe into the bonuses he received just days before the Bank of America takeover. Charges of criminal fraud can be brought under the 1921 Martin Act against a person receiving an illicit executive payout.

CIT Group
On February 7, 2010, Reuters reported that CIT Group had announced that it was hiring Thain to replace interim CEO Peter Tobin. In 2013, CIT paid him $8.25 million.

On October 21, 2015, CIT Group announced that Thain will retire effective March 31, 2016, and will continue to serve as chairman of the board of directors. Ellen R. Alemany, former head of the Americas division of Royal Bank of Scotland, will replace Thain as CEO.

Memberships
Thain is a member of the following organizations: 
MIT Sloan School of Management – North American Executive Board
The New York Botanical Garden – Board of Managers, Investment Committee. Thain and his wife, Carmen, are both active members of the NYBG Board. Their philanthropy includes helping the Garden restore and preserve its 50-acre old-growth Thain Family Forest.
INSEAD – U.S. National Advisory Board
James Madison Council of the Library of Congress
Federal Reserve Bank of New York's International Capital Markets Advisory Committee
French-American Foundation
 Board of Trustees of the National Urban League
The Trilateral Commission
Yale University – John and Carmen Thain established the "Thain Family Café", which is part of the Yale University Anne T. and Robert M. Bass Library.  The Café offers refreshments prepared with organic and local ingredients, secured through the Yale Sustainable Food Project.  At the dedication of the Library in November 2007, Thain spoke warmly of Yale's attention to its undergraduates (his daughter attended the University) and stated, "This was a way for us to give back and contribute to the student experience."
New York-Presbyterian Hospital Board of Trustees of since 2000 
 Republican Party – Thain is a prominent member of the party and was a personal friend of Senator John McCain. Thain was a senior economic policy adviser to McCain and was considered a leading candidate to be his Treasury Secretary. In support of McCain's unsuccessful 2008 bid for the presidency, Thain sponsored a number of fundraisers, including a $2,300-a-seat breakfast at The Regency Hotel on Park Avenue on December 14, 2007.

Personal life 
He is active in social work and served as gala co-chair for a Publicolor event in New York City that honored Rick Segal, Publicolor's former board chair.

Thain and his wife have two daughters and two sons. Thain has a house on North Captiva Island in south west Florida. His apartment at 740 Park Avenue was listed for sale in 2018.

Political contributions 
In 2015, Thain contributed $205,000 to the pro-Jeb Bush Super PAC Right to Rise. The only other political contribution he made in 2015 was $5,400 to Rob Portman. In the past Thain has contributed significant amounts of money to both Democratic and Republican candidates.

References

External links
 Commentary: 'No possible way to justify' bonus request, from CNN
 Bank of America's John Thain should go to jail, Kansas City Star editorial
 Ousted boss John Thain gored Merrill Lynch's bull with a gold-plated office and stealth bonuses, New York Daily News editorial
 Mr.Thain Moves In. The Big Board's new Chief, from The Economist
  Breaking the Bank PBS Frontline documentary with interviews of John Thain and Ken Lewis about the acquisition of Merrill Lynch by Bank of America amidst the 2008 fiscal crisis.

1955 births
American chief executives of financial services companies
American investment bankers
Bank of America people
Goldman Sachs people
Directors of Uber
Harvard Business School alumni
Living people
MIT School of Engineering alumni
Merrill (company) people
New York Stock Exchange people
People from Antioch, Illinois